Christoffer Østergaard (born 22 May 1993) is a retired Danish footballer.

Club career

Hobro IK
Hastrup got his debut for Hobro IK on 28 March 2013 against HB Køge in at match, which Hobro IK won 1-0. Østergaard was in the starting line-up.

Østergaard left Hobro on 31 January 2016 due to lack of playing time.

Brabrand IF
Just one day after his contract was terminated with Hobro, he signed with Danish 2nd Division side Brabrand IF.

Skive IK
On 17 July 2016 it was confirmed that Østergaard had signed a contract with Skive IK. He played his first game for Skive on 24 July 2016 against FC Fredericia. After a bad knee injury that would keep him out for a year, Østergaard left Skive in the summer 2020.

Brabrand IF
On 6 February 2021, Østergaard returned to Brabrand IF. Due to his knee injury, he was signed in a role as a player-assistant coach, so he could slowly recover from his long injury.

Return to Hobro
Østergaard trained with Hobro IK in the 2021-22 pre-season. On 29 July 2021, he signed a season-long deal with his childhood club, which he got his debut for back in 2013. On 21 May 2022 it was confirmed, that 29-year old Østergaard would retire at the end of the season.

Private life
Østergaard went on Mariagerfjord Gymnasium from 2010 until 2013. According to the website of Hobro IK, Østergaard is fan of Manchester United, and his favourite player is David Beckham.

References

External links
 Christoffer Østergaard at Soccerway

1991 births
Living people
Danish men's footballers
Association football defenders
Hobro IK players
Skive IK players
Brabrand IF players
Danish Superliga players
Danish 1st Division players
Danish 2nd Division players